Felice Prevete (born March 31, 1987) is an Italian footballer who currently plays for U.S. Poggibonsi. He is 6'1" tall and weighs twelve stone. He was born in Battipaglia, but he grew up in Baiano. Prevete made his debut in the 2007-08 UEFA Cup competition, in a game against FC Zürich, playing in the centre of midfield. The match finished 2-1, with Prevete picking up a yellow card in the 69th minute.

Prevete wore the number 87 jersey for Empoli.

Appearances on Italian Series 

Serie A : 0 Apps

Serie C1 : 40 Apps

External links
 

1987 births
Italian footballers
Empoli F.C. players
F.C. Crotone players
Potenza S.C. players
Living people
Sportspeople from the Province of Salerno
Association football midfielders
Footballers from Campania